{{DISPLAYTITLE:C11H16}}
The molecular formula C11H16 (molar mass: 148.24 g/mol, exact mass: 148.1252 u) may refer to:

 Ectocarpene
 Pentamethylbenzene

Molecular formulas